Against the Grain may refer to:

Broadcast media
Against the Grain (TV series), a 1993 American drama series with Ben Affleck
"Against the Grain", a regular segment on The Dan Patrick Show

Literature
 Against the Grain (novel) or À rebours, an 1884 novel by Joris-Karl Huysmans
 Against the Grain: A Deep History of the Earliest States by James C. Scott
 Against the Grain: An Autobiography, by Boris Yeltsin
 Against the Grain: How Agriculture Has Hijacked Civilization, by Richard Manning
 Against the Grain: Mad Artist Wallace Wood, edited by Bhob Stewart

Music 
 Against the Grain (Acoustic Alchemy album), 1994
 Against the Grain (Bad Religion album), 1990
 Against the Grain (Kurupt album), 2005
 Against the Grain (Phoebe Snow album), 1978
 Against the Grain (Redgum album), 2004
 Against the Grain (Rory Gallagher album), 1975
 Against the Grain (Snakefinger album), 1983
 Against the Grain (The Veer Union album), 2009
 Against da Grain, a 1999 album by YoungBloodZ
 "Against the Grain", a song by Akon from Freedom
 "Against the Grain", song by Garth Brooks from Ropin' the Wind